It Was High Time to Escape is 31Knots' fourth album. It was released on September 2, 2003 by the 54º40' or Fight! label.

Track listing
 "A Half Life in Two Movements" – 1:46
 "Darling, I" – 4:09
 "The Gospel According to Efficiency" – 4:15
 "No Sound" – 2:53
 "We Still Have Legs" – 5:52
 "Without Wine" – 3:46
 "That Which Has No Name" – 4:56
 "At Peace" – 4:08
 "Played Out for Punchlines" – 3:58
 "Matters From Ashes" – 4:17

Personnel
 31Knots - Main performer
 Ian Pellicci - Engineer, Mixing
 Jarrod Dandrea - Assistant Engineer
 Jay Pellicci - Drums, Engineer, Mixing
 Jay Winebrenner - Bass, Guitar
 Joe Haege - Guitar, Mixing, Piano, Sampling, Vocals
 Joe Kelly - Drums, Vocals
 Shayla Hason - Photography
 Tom Carr - Mastering

References

31Knots albums
2003 albums